Cambridgeshire and Isle of Ely County Council was the county council of Cambridgeshire and Isle of Ely in the east of England. It came into its powers on 1 April 1965 and was abolished on 1 April 1974. The county council was based at Shire Hall, Cambridge. It was amalgamated with Huntingdon and Peterborough County Council to form an enlarged Cambridgeshire County Council in 1974.

References

Former county councils of England
Local authorities in Cambridgeshire
Local education authorities in England